Peter Robert Chacon  (June 10, 1925 - December 14, 2014) served in the California State Assembly for the 79th district from 1971 to 1992.

Early life and education

He enlisted in the United States Army Air Forces from 1943 - 1945 and served in Germany during World War II. He attended San Diego Community College and received a bachelor of arts and a master's of school administration from San Diego State University.

References

1925 births
2014 deaths
United States Army Air Forces personnel of World War II
San Diego State University alumni
United States Army Air Forces soldiers
Democratic Party members of the California State Assembly
20th-century American politicians